HMS E17 was a British E-class submarine built by Vickers, Barrow-in-Furness. She was laid down on 29 July 1914, launched on 16 January 1915 and was commissioned on 7 April 1915. HMS E17 was wrecked off Texel in the North Sea on 6 January 1916. Her crew were rescued by a Dutch cruiser . They were interned. The conning tower of E17 is preserved as a monument at the Royal Navy Submarine Museum in Gosport, the United Kingdom.

Design
She was powered by two  Vickers eight-cylinder two-stroke diesel engines and two  electric motors.

As with most of the early E-class boats, E17 was not fitted with a deck gun during construction, but probably had one fitted later forward of the conning tower. She had five 18-inch (450 mm) torpedo tubes, two in the bow, one either side amidships, and one in the stern; a total of 10 torpedoes were carried.

E-class submarines had wireless systems with  power ratings; in some submarines, these were later upgraded to  systems by removing a midship torpedo tube. Their maximum design depth was  although in service some reached depths of below . Some submarines contained Fessenden oscillator systems.

Her complement was three officers and 28 men.

References

External links

 'Submarine losses 1904 to present day' - Royal Navy Submarine Museum 

 

British E-class submarines of the Royal Navy
Ships built in Barrow-in-Furness
1915 ships
World War I submarines of the United Kingdom
World War I shipwrecks in the North Sea
Royal Navy ship names
Maritime incidents in 1916